Ellen Whitaker (born 5 March 1986) is an English show jumping rider, currently ranked 191 on the FEI riders Longines Ranking list in July 2022.

Career 
Competing since the age of 5, Whitaker has had much experience in the equestrian world and qualified for HOYS at just 8 years old.

In 2006, Whitaker and her father Steven Whitaker were hit with a legal dispute over ownership of thirteen horses, including her top horse Locarno. However, a few months later a peace deal was made.

In 2007, Whitaker represented Great Britain in the European Championships and helped allow Britain to qualify for the Olympics after jumping triple clear. She missed out on being selected for the 2008 Beijing Olympics due to lameness in horse Locarno 62.

In 2010, Whitaker spoke to the press after refusing to jump for the British team due to a conflict with the British team manager, Rob Hoekstra. She told Horse & Hound: "I only have Ocolado at the moment and Rob wanted to interfere with the way I do everything." Her father and manager Steven Whitaker added: "It's not a matter of Ellen not wanting to jump for her country, but we won't jump again until Rob Hoekstra is finished." But British Equestrian Federation World Class performance director Will Connell said: "The riders wanted stronger management and leadership and that's what Rob is delivering." Hoekstra did not wish to comment, saying: "I do not think team issues are best resolved through the press."

Personal life 
She is the daughter of former show jumper Stephen Whitaker and his wife Carol, and niece of riders John and Michael Whitaker. Her brothers Joe, Thomas, and Donald, as well as her cousins Robert, William, Louise, Joanne, George, James, and Jack are also show jumpers.

She lives on the family farm near Barnsley, South Yorkshire, and attended Penistone Grammar School.

On 19 September 2011, Whitaker pleaded guilty to driving under the influence. Whitaker was stopped by local Police in Knutsford Town Centre, Cheshire at 2 am after she attended a charity ball. A roadside breath test proved positive and she was taken to a police station where her lowest reading was 77 microgrammes of alcohol in 100 millilitres of breath – more than double the legal limit of 35.

She was engaged to British actor Henry Cavill from 2011 until 2012.

Whitaker and Spanish showjumper Antonio Marinas Soto have two sons together, born May 2014 and March 2016.

On 5 August 2016, Whitaker and Soto announced their engagement.

Horses

Current
 Arena UK Winston (born 2009), ISH, Stallion, sired by: waldo, damsire: Hamilton Tropics Owner: Ellen Whitaker
 Irorko VD Brouwershoeve (born 2008), Belgian Warmblood, Gelding, sire: Canturano, dam: Artemis, Owners: Jose Bono Rodríguez & Club Hipico Fierro
 Luibanta BH (born 2008), ISH, Stallion, sire: Luidam, Dam Sire: Abantos Owner: Gochman Sport Horse LLC
 Virginia (born 2005), Mare, sire: Centauer Z, dam: Bella Madona, Owners: Haudani Consulting S.L
 “Spacecake” (born 2012), Mare, sire Stakkatol, Dam Sire: Kannan. Owner: Tilly Shaw
 “Conshira Blue PS” (born 2013), Mare, sire Conthargos, Dam Sire: Chacco-Blue. Owner: Tilly Shaw

Former show horses
 Magic Mal
 Miami Bound
 Savy Mill
 Lawyer
 Great Love
 Kanselier (born 1992), Dutch Warmblood, gelding, sired by: Notaris, damsire: Nimmerdor
 Locarno 62 (born 1996), Holsteiner horse, Stallion, sire Lord Calidos, damsire: Romino, Owners: Dawn Makin & Steven Whitaker
 Equimax Ocolado (born 1996), Dutch Warmblood, Gelding, sire: Habsburg, damsire: Calvados, Owners: Dawn Makin & Steven Whitaker
 Ladina B (born 1997), Württemberger, Mare
 Royal Rose (born 1998), Dutch Warmblood, Stallion, sire: Calvados, Owner: Steven Whitaker
 Ximena (born 2001), Mare, sire: Irco Mena 763, damsire: Hertigen, Owners: Dawn Makin & Steven Whitaker
 Arena UK Lando (born 2002), Oldenburg horse, Gelding, sire: Landor S, damsire: Lord, Owner: Norman Orly

Successes 
 European Junior Championships: 
 2003, San Remo: Rank 2 (Team)
 European Championships: 
 2007, Mannheim: Rank 3 (Team)

Among many others, some of her achievements are:
 Winning the 2010 British Open Show Jumping Championships
 Winning the 2010 Hickstead Speed Derby
 Winning the 2009 HOYS show jumper of the year Grand Prix and show jumper of the show
 Winning the HOYS speed stakes in 2006, 2008 and 2009
 Winning the HOYS 2009 Puissance
 Winning the 2007 Hickstead Speed Derby

Video Game 
Koch Media launched Ellen Whitaker's Horse Life video game for PC, Nintendo DS and Wii.

References

External links 
 Team GBR Rider History for Miss E C Whitaker

Living people
1986 births
English female equestrians
British show jumping riders
People educated at Penistone Grammar School
Sportspeople from Yorkshire